The Ak-Jol or  is a left tributary of the Kara-Suu in Aksy District of Jalal-Abad Region, Kyrgyzstan. The river takes its rise in the south-west slopes of the Fergana Range. The maximum flow is in May-June and the minimum - in January - February. The river is used for irrigation.

References

Rivers of Kyrgyzstan